Flag Springs is an unincorporated community in Andrew County, in the U.S. state of Missouri.

History
A post office called Flag Springs was established in 1870, and remained in operation until 1907. The community took its name from a nearby spring noted for the flag irises along its course.

References

Unincorporated communities in Andrew County, Missouri
Unincorporated communities in Missouri